The office of Mohammad Javad Bahonar, Prime Minister of Iran, was bombed on 30 August 1981 by the People's Mujahedin of Iran (MEK), killing Bahonar, President Mohammad Ali Rajai, and six other Iranian government officials. The briefcase bombing came two months after the Hafte Tir bombing, which killed over seventy senior Iranian officials, including Chief Justice Mohammad Beheshti, then Iran's second-highest official.

According to sources, nobody "knew exactly who had been in the room at the time of the detonation." Eventually, there were three participants that had been unaccounted for that including  Masoud Keshmiri, Rajai, and Bahonar. It was later revealed that both Rajai and Bahonar had died in the explosion. According to Albert Benliot, Ayatollah Khomeini charged the MEK with responsibility for the bombing, "however, there has been much speculation among academics and observers that these bombings may have actually been planned by senior Islamic Republican Party (IRP) leaders, including later Iranian President Ali Akbar Hashemi-Rafsanjani, to rid themselves of rivals within the IRP."

Afterward, the interim presidential council announced five national days of mourning, and Iran's Parliament selected Ayatollah Mahdavi Kani as the next prime minister.
Parliament held an election on 2 October 1981 to elect Bahonar's successor;

Bombing

On 30 August 1981 a bomb exploded in the office of Mohammad Javad Bahonar, Prime Minister of Iran, which killed Bahonar, President Mohammad Ali Rajai and some other officials.

According to the survivors, the bomb exploded when one of the victims opened a briefcase brought by Masoud Keshmiri as an "agent of MEK". 

The explosion destroyed the first floor. Due to their severe burns, the corpses were not easily identified. Rajai and Bahonar were identified through their teeth. They had won the election with 91 percent of the vote and were in power for less than four weeks before the assassination.
Their funeral was held the next day with nearly 500,000 attendees.

Prominent officials killed
 President Mohammad Ali Rajai
 Prime Minister Mohammad Javad Bahonar
 Col. Vahid Dastjerdi, chief of Iranian police
 Abdol Hossein Daftarian

Suspects
Although no group claimed responsibility for the bombing, it was nevertheless attributed to the MEK. Ann K. Reed notes that Western observers believe the People's Mujahedin of Iran (MEK) was "most likely to have been responsible for the bomb blasts of June 28 and August 30." However, Van England notes that "the explosions were set off by insiders – the first by an accomplice working in the offices of the IRP, the second by the guard in charge of security at Prime Minister Bahonar's headquarters." Mangol Bayat also expressed doubts that the MEK would be capable the attacks "since infiltration of the regime at the very high level would have been necessary." The Islamic Republic of Iran later claimed  that the attack was carried out by MEK agent Masoud Keshmiri, secretary of Bahonar's office and of the Supreme National Security Council, who used a fake passport to escape Iran after the attack.

More than twenty suspects were identified in the subsequent investigation, including Masoud Keshmiri, Ali Akbar Tehrani, Mohammad Kazem Peiro Razawi, Khosro Ghanbari Tehrani, Javad Ghadiri, Mohsen Sazgara, Taghi Mohammadi, and Habibollah Dadashi.

Perpetrator
The Islamic Republic of Iran identified Masoud Keshmiri (who had served as Bahonar's office secretary for a year prior to the bombing) as the perpetrator. An official in the Prosecutor General's office said that Keshmiri had concealed his anti-government activities so well that a corpse mistaken for his was buried on 31 August with full honors as a martyr of the Islamic revolution.

Abdol Hossein Daftarian was stuck in the elevator after the explosion, where he suffocated to death. The MEK bought some time for Keshmiri by spreading the rumor that the man found in the elevator was actually him. Although the Iranian authorities arrested and executed numerous MEK agents, Keshmiri fled the country using a fake passport.

Aftermath
Parliament held an election on 2 October 1981 to elect Bahonar's successor. Tehran radio also said that the Islamic republic would "continue the firing squad executions of opponents blamed for assassinating the original inner circle of the Islamic leadership".

See also

References 

Prime Minister's office bombing
20th century in Tehran
Attacks in 1981
August 1981 events in Asia
Conflicts involving the People's Mojahedin Organization of Iran
Crime in Tehran
Explosions in Iran
Mass murder in 1981
Building bombings in Iran